The 43rd Assembly District of Wisconsin is one of 99 districts in the Wisconsin State Assembly.  Located in southern Wisconsin, the district comprises central Rock County, and much of southeast Dane County.  It includes the cities of Edgerton and Stoughton, as well as the villages of Brooklyn, Footville, and Oregon.  It also contains Blackhawk Technical College and Lake Kegonsa State Park.  The district is represented by Democrat Jenna Jacobson, since January 2023.

The 43rd Assembly district is located within Wisconsin's 15th Senate district, along with the 44th and 45th Assembly districts.

List of past representatives

References 

Wisconsin State Assembly districts
Dane County, Wisconsin
Jefferson County, Wisconsin
Rock County, Wisconsin
Walworth County, Wisconsin